A grifter may refer to:

Arts and entertainment
 Grifters (band), a 1990s American indie rock band
 The Grifters (novel), a 1963 American novel by Jim Thompson
 The Grifters (film), a 1990 American adaptation of the novel
 Grifter (character), a fictional comic book superhero

Other uses
 Grifter, a practitioner of confidence tricks
 No. 84 Squadron RAF (call sign: GRIFTER), a British search and rescue air squadron
 Raleigh Grifter, an English children's bicycle made by Raleigh 1976–1983

See also
 The Grifter's Hymnal, a 2012 album by American Ray Wylie Hubbard
 Tachigui: The Amazing Lives of the Fast Food Grifters, a 2006 Japanese film directed by Mamoru Oshii
 Grift (disambiguation)
 Hustle (disambiguation)